The 1940 Singapore Open, also known as the 1940 Singapore Badminton Championships, took place from 20 October – 14 December 1940 at the Clerical Union Hall in Balestier, Singapore. The ties were played over a few months with the first round ties being played on the 20 of October and the last (men's doubles final) been played on 14 December. There was no women's doubles competition due to the lack of entries.

Venue
Clerical Union Hall

Final results

References 

Singapore Open (badminton)
1940 in badminton